Viktorija Doneva (born 24 October 1991) is a Macedonian footballer who plays as a goalkeeper for Bulgarian Women's Championship club FC NSA Sofia. She has been a member of the Macedonia women's national team.

References

1991 births
Living people
Women's association football goalkeepers
Macedonian women's footballers
North Macedonia women's international footballers
Macedonian expatriate footballers
Macedonian expatriate sportspeople in Slovenia
Expatriate women's footballers in Slovenia
Macedonian expatriate sportspeople in Bulgaria
Expatriate footballers in Bulgaria
FC NSA Sofia players